Dhaner Dam, is a gravity dam near Nandgaon, Nashik district in state of Maharashtra in India.

Specifications

Purpose
 Irrigation

See also
 Dams in Maharashtra
 List of reservoirs and dams in India

References

Dams in Nashik district
Dams completed in 1979
Dams on the Tapti River
1979 establishments in Maharashtra